François Brueren (born 16 January 1940) is a Belgian speed skater. He competed in the men's 500 metres event at the 1964 Winter Olympics.

References

1940 births
Living people
Belgian male speed skaters
Olympic speed skaters of Belgium
Speed skaters at the 1964 Winter Olympics
Place of birth missing (living people)